Landon Y. (Lanny) Jones is an American editor and author. He is a former managing editor of People magazine and the author of William Clark and the Shaping of the West, a biography of William Clark, joint leader of the Lewis and Clark Expedition.

Jones also edited a selection of the expedition journals, The Essential Lewis and Clark, and is the author of Great Expectations: America and the Baby Boom Generation.

Bibliography

References

External links

People from St. Louis County, Missouri
Living people
Year of birth missing (living people)
Princeton University alumni
Writers from Bozeman, Montana